A perpend stone, perpend (parpen, parpend, perpin, and other spellings), through stone, bond stone, or tie stone is a stone that extends through an entire wall's width, from the outer to the inner wall. Such stones are especially used to lock two wall layers structurally together. Usually stone walls are built with two layers of stone, an inner and an outer layer, with the space between them sometimes filled with rubble. 

The term perpend is also used to refer to a joint in brickwork also called a cross joint or, when extending through the entire wall, a transverse joint or perpend bond.

References

Stonemasonry
Building stone
Types of wall